Magda Lilia Chelly (born 1983) is a Polish-Tunisian cybersecurity expert and is amongst the first Tunisian women to be on the advisory board of BlackHat Asia Executive Committee. Born in Krakow, Poland, and educated in Tunisia and France, Chelly worked as an IT consultant, university lecturer, business leader, and cybersecurity professional.

In 2016, Chelly established her own cybersecurity start-up out of Singapore, Asia. She is the founding member of Women on Cyber, a non-profit diversity group. Chelly has a long history of involvement in diversity and inclusion activism as she launched the first Catch The Flag competition for girls in Singapore with the support of Cyber Security Agency of Singapore.

Early life 
Chelly was born in Krakow, a town in south Poland, in 1983. Following her father's advice on the importance of getting an engineering degree, Chelly completed a Degree and a Master in Telecommunication Engineering before moving to France. There, Chelly completed and a PhD in the same field at Telecom SudParis, Évry, France.

Career 
Chelly worked with several organizations as cybersecurity advisor.

Research 
Chelly's research career started with working on Indoor Positioning within Telecom SudParis. She later on expanded her research in cybersecurity. Amongst her scientific papers are:

 New techniques for indoor positioning, combining deterministic and estimation methods
 Wifi hybridisation with pseudolites and repeaters for indoor positioning purposes
 Social Media and the impact on education: Social media and home education

She was one of the reviewers for Annals of telecommunications - annales des télécommunications volume 65, pages 129–131, by the publisher Springer in 2009.

Books 
Chelly is the co-author, with Hai Tran and Shamane Tan, of one book on computer security and is an author of a science fiction book:

 (2022) Building a Cyber Resilient Business
 (2021) Light, Shadow, and Cyber: Vera's Cyber Adventures

Media 
Chelly was featured as a cybersecurity expert in The Dark Web Documentary on Channel News Asia.

Filmography 
Chelly appeared in Love Me, Original title: Aime-moi (2009); a short movie with Armelle Deutsch: Toute la mort devant soi (2009), Love Me (2009), Utopium: Song for an Artist (2008).

Awards and recognition 
Chelly received various awards, across her career, including the below:

 The IFSEC Global influencers in security and fire 2021

See also 
 Indoor positioning system
 Wi-Fi positioning system
 Social media in education

References

External links 

 

 
 
 ماجدة شيلى

Computer security academics
Computer security specialists
Ethical hackers
Living people
1983 births